The Neotaenioglossa is a taxonomic name for a large group of mostly sea snails. The name was originally created by Haller in 1882. Ponder and Warén (1988), and Marquet (1997), assigned this name to the superorder Caenogastropoda. ITIS considers the order Neotaenioglossa to be a synonym of Cerithioidea  Férussac, 1819 .

The taxonomy of the Gastropoda (Bouchet & Rocroi, 2005) no longer used this name. All families were assigned to the clades Littorinimorpha, Neogastropoda and to the informal group Ptenoglossa, all within the clade Hypsogastropoda.

Families
List of families in the order Neotaenioglossa:
 Aclididae G.O. Sars, 1878
 Annulariidae
 Aporrhaididae
 Assimineidae H. and A. Adams, 1856
 Atlantidae Wiegmann and Ruthe, 1832
 Barleeiidae
 Batillariidae
 Bithyniidae
 Bursidae Thiele, 1925
 Caecidae Gray, 1815
 Calyptraeidae Blainville, 1824
 Capulidae Fleming, 1822
 Carinariidae Blainville, 1818
 Cassidae Latreille, 1825
 Cerithiidae Fleming, 1822
 Cerithiopsidae H. and A. Adams, 1854
 Cypraeidae Rafinesque, 1815
 Elachisinidae
 Epitoniidae S.S. Berry, 1910
 Eulimidae
 Falsicingulidae
 Ficidae Conrad, 1867
 Haloceratidae
 Hipponicidae Troschel, 1861
 Hydrobiidae Simpson, 1865
 Janthinidae Leach, 1823
 Litiopidae
 Littorinidae Gray, 1840
 Modulidae
 Naticidae Guilding, 1834
 Obtortionidae
 Ovulidae Fleming, 1822
 Pelycidiidae
 Personidae
 Pickworthiidae
 Planaxidae Gray, 1850
 Pleuroceridae
 Potamididae H. and A. Adams, 1854
 Pterotracheidae Gray, 1840
 Ranellidae Gray, 1854
 Rissoidae Gray, 1847
 Siliquariidae Anton, 1839
 Skeneopsidae Iredale, 1915
 Strombidae Rafinesque, 1815
 Thiaridae
 Tonnidae Peile, 1926
 Tornidae
 Triphoridae Gray, 1847
 Triviidae Trochel, 1863
 Truncatellidae Gray, 1840
 Turritellidae Clarke, 1851
 Vanikoridae Gray, 1845
 Velutinidae Gray, 1840
 Vermetidae Rafinesque, 1815
 Vitrinellidae Bush, 1897
 Xenophoridae Philippi, 1853

References

Obsolete gastropod taxa